Pete McLeod (born February 23, 1984 in Kapuskasing, Ontario) is a Canadian professional aerobatic pilot whose first competitive flight was in the Red Bull Air Race World Championship in 2009.

Biography

Raised in Red Lake, a small town in Northwestern Ontario, McLeod grew up hunting, fishing, snowmobiling, boating, flying, and playing hockey. He took his first flight in the family plane when he was 6 weeks old. McLeod’s mother, Margaret, recalls that when he was six McLeod would sit on his father Dave’s lap during flights, hands on the control column. He learned to fly float and ski planes, undergoing flight training at Harv's Air Service in Steinbach, Manitoba and qualifying for his private pilot’s licence at 16. He built up his flying hours over the next couple of years, earning his commercial licence and float endorsement when he was 18. McLeod spent the summers flying fishermen to remote outpost camps.

He earned his aerobatic flight instructor rating when he was 18, and began flying competition aerobatics in a Pitts Special in 2003. He was undefeated in his first full competitive season in 2004, winning multiple awards in his class, a United States Regional Series Championship, and the 2004 North American Collegiate Aerobatic Championship.

After completing his Economics degree at the University of Western Ontario, he decided at the start of the 2006 season to join the air show circuit and focus all his energy on professional aerobatics. He finished the season with a second place advanced category finish at the United States National Aerobatic Championships. In 2007 he earned his unrestricted surface level aerobatic waiver, one of the youngest pilots in the world to hold such a waiver for high performance aerobatics.

Red Bull Air Race pilot
McLeod's 12th-place finish at the European Aerobatic Championships in the Czech Republic in 2008 earned him an invitation to attend the Red Bull Air Race qualification camp in Casarrubios, Spain, at the end of September 2008. Of the six pilots invited, five qualified for the ‘super’ licence required to compete in the world championship and McLeod was one of four rookies selected for active race status.

He joined the Red Bull Air Race World Championship in 2009, the youngest rookie ever to qualify for the Red Bull Air Race and the first Canadian. Prior to the start of the 2009 season, McLeod assembled a team of technicians and support staff for his first year on the circuit. He modified his new Zivko Edge 540 350 horsepower aerobatic airplane into a high performance racer.

McLeod's goal was to become a strong presence in the top 5 pilots in his second and third seasons. "I would like to become world champion by the time I'm 30 years old", said McLeod. "The setup is not going to be 100% for at least a year because it’s not just the pilot but the team that’s also learning. You don’t need the fastest airplane in the track in your first year because there’s so much to learn", he said.

Achievements

2003
1st place, Ontario Open Aerobatic Championship (first competitive event)
Completion of Emergency Maneuver Training course

2004
North American Collegiate Aerobatic Champion
Mid-America Series Champion
Undefeated in 2004 with five 1st Place finishes
Four time winner of the Highest Scoring Pitts Award
Posted highest percentage point average in North America – 90.67%

2006
2nd place Advanced Category, U.S. National Aerobatic Championships
B.F. Goodrich Award recipient at the U.S. National Championships
Youngest Canadian air show performer
Seven 1st place and two 2nd place career finishes (9 career competition events to date)

2007
Unrestricted Surface Level (0 ft) Aerobatic Display Waiver

2008
12th Place – European Aerobatic Championship
Announced: 2009 Red Bull Air Race World Championship Rookie
Red Bull Air Race Super License Holder

2009
15th place overall, Red Bull Air Race World Championship
15th Place – Red Bull Air Race – Abu Dhabi (UEA) – 0 points
15th Place – Red Bull Air Race – San Diego (USA) – 0 points
11th Place – Red Bull Air Race – Windsor, ON (Canada) – 1 point
13th Place – Red Bull Air Race – Budapest (HUN) – 0 points
14th Place – Red Bull Air Race – Porto (POR) – 0 points
12th Place – Red Bull Air Race – Barcelona (Spain) – 0 points

2010
5th place overall, Red Bull Air Race World Championship
5th Place – Red Bull Air Race – Abu Dhabi (UEA) – 7 points
5th Place – Red Bull Air Race – Perth (Australia) – 7 points
7th Place – Red Bull Air Race – Rio de Janeiro (Brazil) – 5 Points
9th Place – Red Bull Air Race – Windsor (Canada) – 3 Points
5th Place – Red Bull Air Race – New York City (USA) – 7 Points
8th Place – Red Bull Air Race – Lausitz (Germany) – 4 points

2011
McLeod performed air shows across Canada in his Edge 540 aircraft during the summer of 2011.

2012
McLeod performed at 15 air shows across Canada in his Edge 540 aircraft during the summer of 2012.

2014
5th place overall, Red Bull Air Race World Championship
3rd Place – Red Bull Air Race – Abu Dhabi (UEA) – 7 Points
4th Place – Red Bull Air Race – Rovinj (Croatia) – 5 Points
4th Place – Red Bull Air Race – Putrajaya (Malaysia) – 5 Points
8th Place – Red Bull Air Race – Gdynia (Poland) – 1 Point
11th Place – Red Bull Air Race – Ascot (UK) – 0 Points
3rd Place – Red Bull Air Race – Dallas / Fort Worth (USA) – 7 Points
1st Place – Red Bull Air Race – Las Vegas (USA) – 12 Points
8th Place – Red Bull Air Race – Spielberg (Austria) – 1 Point

Red Bull Air Race World Championship

2009-2010

2014-

Legend:
 CAN: Cancelled
 DNP: Did not participate
 DNS: Did not show
 DQ: Disqualified
 NC: Not classified

See also
 Competition aerobatics
 FAI

References

External links 

 Pete McLeod Racing – Pete McLeod's website

1984 births
Living people
People from Kapuskasing
University of Western Ontario alumni
Aerobatic pilots
Canadian aviators
Canadian air racers
Red Bull Air Race World Championship pilots